Gustav Siehr (17 September 1837 – 18 May 1896) was a German Hofoper- and Kammersänger bass.

Life 

Born in Arnsberg, Province of Westphalia, as the son of a senior government councillor, Siehr first studied medicine at University of Königsberg. As an inaktive, he moved to the University of Jena and the Humboldt University of Berlin. In Berlin, he decided to train his voice with Julius Krause and Heinrich Dorn. In 1864–65, he was at the Gothenburg German Opera House, in 1865–70 at the German Theatre Prague, in 1870–81 at the Hessisches Staatstheater Wiesbaden. In 1881, he went to the Bayerische Staatsoper, of which he remained a member until the end of his life. Siehr was considered a great interpreter of the operas of Richard Wagner. Wagner held the singer in high esteem. He described his vocal delivery and art of characterisation as outstanding.

Siehr died in Munich at the age of 58.

References

Further reading 
 Ludwig Eisenberg: Grosses Biographisches Lexikon der Deutschen Bühne. Paul List publisher, Leipzig 1903, .
 
 Hans-Michael Körner (ed.): Große Bayerische Biographische Enzyklopädie. Vol. 3 P–Z. Saur, Munich 2005,  (eBook, retrieved on De Gruyter online).
 Karl-Josef Kutsch, Leo Riemens: Großes Sängerlexikon. 4th, expanded and updated edition. Vol. 6: Rasa–Sutton. Saur, Munich 2003,  (doi:10.1515/9783598440885, retrieved on De Gruyter online).

External links 
 Siehr, Gustav on BMLO
 Siehr Gustav on Operissimo

German operatic basses
1837 births
1896 deaths
People from Arnsberg